The Pandian Express is a Superfast overnight express train of the Southern Railway zone of the Indian Railways which runs daily between  and  via Villupuram, Vridhachalam and Tiruchirappalli. The inaugural run of this express train is during Oct 01, 1969 on Wednesday.

Introduction 

The name of the train commemorates the 6th century BC to 17th century AD Pandyan Dynasty or Pandian Kingdom of Tamil Nadu. It is a standard train consisting of 23 coaches. The main stops on the way are Chengalpattu, Villupuram, Vriddhachalam, Tiruchirappalli and Dindigul. It is a Prestigious train with Southern Railway Zone. It is now running with LHB rakes (Linke Hoffman Busch) from 15 August 2016 and is maintained at Madurai.

50th Anniversary of Pandian Express was celebrated by Railfans and Rail users on 1/10/2019 at Madurai Junction with a cake cut.

This train had the livery changed twice - first it had the "Olive-Green livery", separated by 2 yellow-lines between the upper & lower part of the windows & later on it was changed to "Maroon colour" on the MG.

This train was numbered as 6717/6718 when it was run on MG. It is now hauled by WAP-7 loco from Royapuram Loco Shed from Madurai to Chennai Egmore and via the same route.

Locomotive
This train was numbered as 6717/6718 when it was run on MG. It is now hauled by 6350HP Fitted WAP-7 loco from Royapuram Loco Shed from Madurai to Chennai Egmore and via the same route.

Rake
Pandian Superfast Express running Brand New LHB Coaches. CCTV Cameras are fitted all Compartments

Coach composition 
In total 22 coaches are there. It includes One AC First Class (1A), AC 2 Tier (2A), AC 3 Tier (3A), Sleeper Class (SL), Unreserved general sitting coach (UR) and End on Generators (EOG).
RSA with Rockfort Superfast Express/Cholan Express.

See also 
Cheran Express
Cholan Superfast Express
Rockfort Superfast Express
Vaigai Superfast Express
Nellai Superfast Express
Pothigai Superfast Express

References

External links 
 Indian Railways

Transport in Chennai
Named passenger trains of India
Transport in Madurai
Rail transport in Tamil Nadu
Railway services introduced in 1969
Express trains in India